Something about silencing protein 10 is a protein that in humans is encoded by the UTP3 gene.

References

Further reading